In mathematics, the identity theorem for Riemann surfaces is a theorem that states that a holomorphic function is completely determined by its values  on any subset of its domain that has a limit point.

Statement of the theorem
Let  and  be Riemann surfaces, let  be connected, and let  be holomorphic. Then  (on the whole of ).

References 
 

Theorems in complex analysis
Riemann surfaces